This is a list of notable personalities from Pratapgarh, Uttar Pradesh, India.

Literature and science  

 Harivansh Rai Bachchan
 Sumitranandan Pant
 Imran Pratapgarhi
 Nazish Pratapgarhi
 Nirjhar Pratapgarhi
 Swadesh Bharti
 Jumai Khan Azad
 Bhikhari Das
 Deepak Dhar

Independence activists 

 Baba Ram Chandra
 Lal Pratap Singh
 Pandit Munishwar Dutt Upadhyay
 Roop Nath Singh Yadav
 Pandit Jawaharlal Nehru
 Pandit Madan Mohan Malaviya
 Rajaram Kisan

Saints and religious icons 

 Swami Karpatri
 Jagatguru Kripalu Maharaj
 Ram Vilas Vedanti

Politicians 

Pandit Munishwar Dutt Upadhyay
 Ajit Pratap Singh
 Deenanath Sewak (Ex. M.L.A. and Ex. Minister, Government of Uttar Pradesh)
 Dinesh Singh
 Swami Karpatri
 Brajesh Singh
 Roop Nath Singh Yadav
 Feroze Gandhi
 Ram Vilas Vedanti
 Raghuraj Pratap Singh alias Raja Bhaiya
 Rajkumari Ratna Singh
 Akshay Pratap Singh
 Pramod Tiwari
 Nagendra Singh Munna Yadav
 Shyama Charan Gupta
 Babulal Gaur
 Abhay Pratap Singh
 Raja Ram Pandey
 Rajendra Pratap Singh alias Moti Singh
 Vinod Saroj
 Aradhana Misra
 Shivakant Ojha
 Sangam Lal Gupta

Bollywood 

 Bachchan family, origins lay in the village of Babupatti in Pratapgarh district
Anupam Shyam Ojha
 Shweta Tiwari
 Abhay Shukla

Sport 
 Manoj Tiwary

Holders of High Constitutional Offices

Lieutenant Governor of other states 
 Raja Bajrang Bahadur Singh (Himachal Pradesh)

Minister of External affair, India 
 Dinesh Singh

See also 
 List of people from Uttar Pradesh
 Pratapgarh district, Uttar Pradesh

References 

People
People from Pratapgarh, Uttar Pradesh